Antonio Hernández (born 16 May 1951) is a Mexican former cyclist who competed in the team time trial at the 1972 Summer Olympics.

References

External links
 

1951 births
Living people
Mexican male cyclists
Olympic cyclists of Mexico
Cyclists at the 1972 Summer Olympics
Place of birth missing (living people)